''Helichrysum'' sp. nov. C is a species of flowering plant in the family Asteraceae. It is found only in Yemen. Its natural habitat is rocky areas. It is threatened by habitat loss.

References

Sp Nov C
Endangered plants
Undescribed plant species
Taxonomy articles created by Polbot